India has the world's largest number of vegetarians. Vegetarianism has been present in India since antiquity although a non-vegetarian diet may be present even on the highest priest caste. Many Indians who do not regularly follow a vegetarian diet may adopt one during religious festivals.

Also, many Indian vegetarians eschew eggs as well as meat. There are many vegetarian cuisines across India.

Air  catering 

On demand most airlines offer Indian vegetarian dishes. Some regard these as dietary meals, some as religious meals. Details may vary.

Pre-ordering the IATA meal code AVML (Asian vegetarian meal) usually results in a meal without meat, poultry, fish, seafood, and eggs. Ingredients can be vegetables, legumes, fresh and dried fruit, dairy products, tofu, cereal, grains, vegetarian gelatine, spices and aromas associated with the Indian sub-continent. The meal can be spiced mildly to hot.

Another option is to pre-order the code VJML (Vegetarian Jain Meal). Compared to AVML only vegetables that grow above the ground are accepted, so onions, garlic, potatoes, carrots, beets, radishes, mushrooms, ginger and turmeric are excluded. No dairy products are used.

See also 

 Indian cuisine
 List of Indian sweets and desserts
 Vegetarian cuisine
 Marwari Bhojanalaya

References

Vegetarian
Vegetarian dishes of India